The Panama men's national basketball team (Spanish: Selección nacional de baloncesto de Panamá) represents Panama in men's international basketball competitions, The team represents both FIBA and FIBA Americas.

With four qualifications to the Basketball World Cup, one qualification to the Olympic Games, and one medal at the Pan American Games, Panama has traditionally been the dominant basketball power in Central America.

Tournament record

Olympic Games
 1968 – 12th

FIBA World Cup
 1970 – 9th
 1982 – 9th
 1986 – 19th
 2006 – 21st

Pan American Games
 1951 – 6th
 1967 –  (3rd place)
 1971 – 6th
 1979 – 7th
 1987 – 6th
 2007 – 5th

FIBA AmeriCup
 1984 – 4th
 1989 – 11th
 1992 – 8th
 1993 – 8th
 1999 – 9th
 2001 – 6th
 2005 – 5th
 2007 – 9th
 2009 – 8th
 2011 – 8th
 2015 – 7th
 2017 – 12th
 2022 – 11th

Central American Championship
 1995 – 4th place
 1999 – 4th place
 2001 –  (3rd place)
 2004 –  (3rd place)
 2006 –  (1st place)
 2008 – 6th
 2010 –  (3rd place)
 2012 – 4th
 2014 – 5th

Team

Current roster
Roster for the 2022 FIBA AmeriCup.

Former players

Head coach position
  Nolan Richardson: 2005
  Guillermo Vecchio: 2006
  Nolan Richardson: 2007

Past rosters
Scroll down to see more.
1968 Olympic Games: finished 12th among 16 teams

Davis Peralta, Norris Webb, Luis Sinclair, Pedro Rivas, Eliecer Ellis, Calixto Malcom, Nicolás Noé Alvarado, Ernesto Arturo Agard, Francisco Checa, Julio Osorio, Pércibal Eduardo Blades, Ramón Reyes (Coach: Eugenio Luzcando)

1970 World Championship: finished 9th among 13 teams

Davis Peralta, Luis Sinclair, Pedro Rivas, Ernesto Arturo Agard, Julio Osorio, Pércibal Eduardo Blades, Julio Andrade, Herbert Cousins, Ronald Walton, Cecilio Straker, Mario Peart, Hector Montalvo (Coach: Carl Pirelli Minetti)

1982 World Championship: finished 9th among 13 teams

Ernesto "Tito" Malcolm, Rolando Frazer, Mario Butler, Rodolfo Gill, Fernando Pinillo, Reggie Grenald, Braulio Rivas, Arturo Brown, Mario Galvez, Adolfo Medrick, Eddie Joe Chávez, Alfonso Smith (Coach: Jim Baron)

1986 World Championship: finished 19th among 24 teams

Ernesto "Tito" Malcolm, Mario Butler, Rolando Frazer, Reggie Grenald, Rodolfo Gill, Fernando Pinillo, Braulio Rivas, Adolfo Medrick, Cirilo Escalona, Mario Gálvez, Enrique Grenald, Daniel Macias (Coach: Frank Holness)

2006 World Championship: finished 21st among 24 teams

Ed Cota, Rubén Garcés, Jaime Lloreda, Ruben Douglas, Michael Hicks, Maximiliano "Max" Gómez, Eric Omar Cardenas, Kevin Daley, Antonio Enrique García, Jair Peralta, Jamaal Levy, Dionisio Gómez (Coach: Guillermo Edgardo Vecchio)

At the 2015 FIBA Americas Championship:

Panama Pipeline
During the late 1970s and early 1980s, various Panama players played their college basketball in the United States at NAIA school Briar Cliff College as part of head coach Ray Nacke's "Panama Pipeline".  Some of the members included national team members Rolando Frazier, Ernesto "Tito" Malcolm, Mario Butler, Eddie Warren, Reggie Grenald, and Mario Galvez.  These players helped Briar Cliff to many NAIA Regional Championships, National Tournament appearances, and in 1981 the Chargers were ranked No. 1 in the nation in the NAIA's final regular season poll.

The new millennium brought another set of very good players from Panama, coming out of the local Superior Basketball Circuit (CBS), the under 21 team, and local players in Division 1 Universities in the United States.  Since 2000, Panama has gone to 4 preolympic tournaments, 5 pre-world championships, one world championship (Japan 2006), and one youth basketball olympics (Singapore 2010). The local program is based in neighborhood leagues that collect talent and export it to the United States. This symbiotic action produces the talent for the National Team.

Usually underrated and underestimated, Panama Basketball always manages to qualify to big tournaments and give stunning surprises, such as beating the United States in the Pan American Games in Rio de Janeiro, Brazil in 2007. Its long basketball tradition dating back to 1904, and its street basketball mentality of fighting hard to the end in basketball games, has made this Central American basketball program a "Classic" in the international scene.

Kit

Manufacturer
2015: Nike

References

External links

FIBA profile
Latinbasket.com - Panama Men National Team 

Men's national basketball teams
Basketball in Panama
basketball
1958 establishments in Panama